The 2022–23 Indonesia Pro Futsal League, is the 15th season of the Indonesia Pro Futsal League competition held by the Indonesian Futsal Federation, as well as the seventh season of futsal competition under the name "Professional Futsal League". The season start on 7 January 2023 and is scheduled to finish on 6 August 2023.

Bintang Timur Surabaya are the defending champions. A total of 12 Indonesian futsal clubs will compete for the championship of this competition, with two clubs coming from the 2021–22 Nusantara Futsal League finalists.

Teams 
Twelve teams is competing in the league – the top tenteams from the previous season and the two teams promoted from the 2021–22 Nusantara League. The promoted teams are Unggul FC and Radit FC.

Name Changes 
 Futsal Jabar was acquired by side Sadakata FC.  As a result, Sadakata took over Futsal Jabar place in Pro Futsal League starting from the 2022–23 season and they will compete under name Sadakata United.

 Vamos FC merged with Fafage FC. and changed its name to Fafage Vamos Banua.

 Pelindo FC merged with Mutiara FC. and changed its name to Pelindo Mutiara FC.

 Kancil BBK Pontianak changed its name (by reason of a new sponsor). and using the name Kancil WHW West Kalimantan for this season.

 Black Steel Manokwari changed its name to Black Steel FC Papua.

Personnel and kits

Foreign players 
The Indonesian futsal federation has rules regarding foreign players, namely:
 Each team may register a maximum of 2 foreign players. 
 Every foreign player must have played with the national team of his home country.

Venue and schedule 
There are 8 locations in 6 cities that will host professional futsal league matches this year.

League table

Results

Season statistics

Top goalscorers 

As of match played on 12 March 2023

Hat-tricks 

4= scored 4 goals

See also 
 Indonesia Women's Pro Futsal League

References 

Futsal in Indonesia